Iraj (also Romanized as Īrāj; also known as Iragh and ‘Irāq) is a village in Nakhlestan Rural District, in the Central District of Khur and Biabanak County, Isfahan Province, Iran. At the 2006 census, its population was 362, in 138 families.

References 

Populated places in Khur and Biabanak County